Usermaatre Amenemope was an ancient Egyptian pharaoh of the 21st Dynasty who ruled between 1001–992 BC or 993–984 BC.

Amenemope's tomb is notable for being one of only two entirely intact royal burials known from ancient Egypt; the other is that of Psusennes I. However, only the metal objects from the tomb survived. Despite its unrobbed state, the wealth in the tomb pales in comparison to that discovered in the near-intact tomb of Tutankhamun.

Reign
A probable son of Psusennes I and his queen Mutnedjmet, Amenemope succeeded his purported father's long reign after a period of coregency. This coregency has been deduced thanks to a linen bandage mentioning a "... king Amenemope, Year 49..." which has been reconstructed as "[Year X under] king Amenemope, Year 49 [under king Psusennes I]". It has been suggested, however, that this Year 49 may belong to the High Priest of Amun Menkheperre instead of Psusennes I, thus ruling out the coregency; this hypothesis has been rejected by Kenneth Kitchen, who still supports a coregency.  Kitchen refers to the existence of Papyrus Brooklyn 16.205, a document mentioning a Year 49 followed by a Year 4, once thought to refer to Shoshenq III and Pami, but more recently to Psusennes I and Amenemope, and thus issued in regnal Year 4 of the latter.

During his reign as Pharaoh, Amenemope claimed the title of "High Priest of Amun in Tanis" as Psusennes also did before him. Amenemope's authority was fully recognized at Thebes – at this time governed by the High Priest of Amun Smendes II and then by his brother Pinedjem II – as his name appears on funerary goods of at least nine Theban burials, among these is the Book of the Dead of the "Captain of the barque of Amun", Pennestawy, dating to Amenemope's Year 5.

Apart from his Tanite tomb and the aforementioned Theban burials, Amemenope is a poorly attested ruler. He continued with the decoration of the chapel of Isis "Mistress of the Pyramids at Giza" and made an addition to one of the temples in Memphis.

All versions of Manetho's Epitome reports that Amenophthis (Amenemope's Hellenised name) enjoyed 9 years of reign, a duration more or less confirmed by archaeological sources. Neither children nor wives are known for him, and he was succeeded by the seemingly unrelated Osorkon the Elder.

According to the analysis of his skeleton performed by Dr. Douglas Derry, Amenemope was a strongly-built man who reached a fairly advanced age. It seems that the king suffered a skull infection which likely developed into meningitis and led to his death.

Burial

Amenemope was originally buried in the only chamber of a small tomb (NRT IV) in the royal necropolis of Tanis; a few years after his death, during the reign of Siamun, Amenemope was moved and reburied in NRT III, inside the chamber once belonging to his purported mother Mutnedjmet and just next to Psusennes I. His undisturbed tomb was rediscovered by French Egyptologists Pierre Montet and Georges Goyon in April 1940, just a month before the Nazi invasion of France. Montet had to stop his excavation until the end of World War II, then resumed it in 1946 and later published his findings in 1958.

When the excavators entered the small burial chamber, they argued that it was originally made for queen Mutnedjmet. The chamber contained an uninscribed granite sarcophagus, some vessels including the canopic jars and the vessel once containing the water used for washing the mummy, and a heap of around 400 ushabtis; a wooden coffin covered with gold leaf was placed within the sarcophagus and contained Amenemope's mummy. On the mummy were found two gilt funerary masks, two pectorals, necklaces, bracelets, rings and a cloisonné collar. Four of these items bore the name of Psusennes I.
The funerary masks depict the king as young, although Goyon stated that at the moment of discovery the masks had an expression of suffering and pleading, later softened after restoration. The mummy and funerary goods are now in Cairo Museum.

Amenemope was buried with far less opulence than his neighbour Psusennes I: for comparison, the latter was provided with a solid silver coffin and a solid gold mask, while the former's coffin and mask were merely gilt.

See also
 List of pharaohs

References

Bibliography
 Derry, D.E., Report on Skeleton of King Amenemopet, ASAE 41 (1942), 149.

External links

Sarcophagus of Amenemope

11th-century BC Pharaohs
10th-century BC Pharaohs
Pharaohs of the Twenty-first Dynasty of Egypt
Ancient Egyptian mummies
11th-century BC births
992 BC deaths
Deaths from meningitis
Neurological disease deaths in Egypt